The Many Facets of Roger is the debut solo project by Dayton, Ohio-based funk musician Roger Troutman. The album went platinum based on the R&B successes of "So Ruff, So Tuff" and his cover of Marvin Gaye's "I Heard It through the Grapevine". In the album, Troutman featured two instrumentals, "A Chunk of Sugar" and "Blue (A Tribute to the Blues)", which was recorded inside Detroit's United Sound Studios.

Track listing
All songs were written and composed by Roger and Larry Troutman unless otherwise noticed.
"I Heard It Through the Grapevine" (10:45) (Norman Whitfield, Barrett Strong)
"So Ruff, So Tuff" (4:49)
"A Chunk of Sugar" (5:28)
"Do It Roger" (8:11)
"Maxx Axe" (8:16)
"Blue (A Tribute to the Blues)" (3:24)

Personnel
Arranged By, Backing Vocals, Electric Piano [Fender Rhodes], Guitar, Keyboards, Lead Vocals, Music By, Synthesizer, Synthesizer [Maxx Axe Synthesized Guitar] - Roger Troutman
Arranged By, Congas, Lyrics By, Percussion - Larry Troutman
Backing Vocals - Bobby Glover, Delores Smith, Greg Jackson, Janetta Boyce, Marchelle Smith
Bass, Backing Vocals - Zapp Troutman
Drums - Lester Troutman
Horns - Carl Cowen
Lead Vocals, Backing Vocals - Dick Smith
Written-By - Larry Troutman (tracks: A2 to B3), Roger Troutman (tracks: A2 to B3)

Charts

Weekly charts

Year-end charts

References

External links
 The Many Facets Of Roger at Discogs.

1981 debut albums
Reprise Records albums
Roger Troutman albums